The 1924–25 Ljubljana Subassociation League was the sixth season of the Ljubljana Subassociation League. Ilirija won the league for the sixth season in a row.

Final table

References

External links
Football Association of Slovenia 

Slovenian Republic Football League seasons
Slovenia
Slovenia
Football
Football